Shafshelar (lit. "sword-bearer") was the second highest ranked court title in the Sasanian Empire. The shafshelar, unlike most other officials, was dressed in a military garb during ceremonies. His task was primarily to carry the king's sword in a gold scabbard.

Sources 

Sasanian court titles